Decahydroxycyclopentane is an organic compound with formula  or . It is a fivefold geminal diol on a cyclopentane backbone.

The compound can be regarded as the fivefold hydrate of cyclopentanepentone. Indeed, the product referred to in the literature and trade as "cyclopentanepentone pentahydrate" is now believed to be the decahydroxycyclopentane.

It can be prepared by oxidation of croconic acid  with nitric acid. It can be isolated as water-soluble colorless crystals that melt with dehydration at about 115 °C, and slowly decompose at about 160 °C.

See also
	
Dodecahydroxycyclohexane

References

Cyclitols
Cyclopentanes
Geminal diols